Rakitu Island, also known as Arid Island, is an uninhabited  island off the northeast coast of Great Barrier Island in the Auckland Region of New Zealand.

Description

The island is located 2.5 kilometres from Great Barrier Island. The island's shores are predominantly steep cliffs, that rise up to 180 metres from sea level. The island's vegetation is a mix of retired farmland, coastal pōhutukawa, mānuka and kānuka. It is a refuge for many native bird species.

Geology

The island is composed of the remains of two late Miocene rhyolite domes. The volcanoes are a part of the Whitianga Group, which erupted between 8 and 12 million years ago

History

Rakitū Island is a part of the traditional rohe of Ngāti Rehua Ngātiwai ki Aotea, and was home to the namesake ancestor of the hapū, Rehua. The central valley was cleared for cultivations, and three pā sites and a number of kāinga were established on Rakitu.

During the early European era, whalers used the island as a base. Following this, it was predominantly used as a cattle grazing area by European settlers.

In 1994, the island became a scenic reserve, following its purchase by the Department of Conservation. In 2020, the island was declared predator free.

See also

 List of islands of New Zealand
 List of islands
 Desert island

References

Inactive volcanoes
Island restoration
Islands of the Auckland Region
Islands of the Hauraki Gulf
Miocene lava domes
Nature reserves in New Zealand
Protected areas of the Auckland Region
Uninhabited islands of New Zealand
Volcanic islands of New Zealand
Volcanoes of the Auckland Region